The Banjaran Timur bent-toed gecko (Cyrtodactylus timur) is a species of gecko. It is endemic to northeastern Peninsular Malaysia.

References 

Cyrtodactylus
Reptiles of the Malay Peninsula
Endemic fauna of Malaysia
Reptiles described in 2014
Taxa named by Shahrul Anuar
Taxa named by Larry Lee Grismer
Taxa named by Mohd Abdul Muin
Taxa named by Evan Quah
Taxa named by Perry L. Wood